Daulet Niyazbekov (born 12 February 1989) is a Kazakh freestyle wrestler, who was a member of the Olympic Games 2012. He competed in the men's freestyle 55 kg and he lost his bronze medal match to World Champion Yang Kyong-il. Niyazbekov was a bronze medalist at the World Wrestling Championships 2011 in Istanbul, Turkey. He won the Asian Wrestling Championship in 2015, as well as bronze at the 2014 and 2017 editions. 

Niyazbekov competed in the men's freestyle 61 kg at the World Wrestling Championships 2015 in Las Vegas, United States. He was eliminated in the quarterfinal rounds, after being defeated by American Reece Humphrey.

He has qualified to represent Kazakhstan at the 2020 Summer Olympics in the men's freestyle 65 kg class.

References

External links
 bio on fila-wrestling.com
 

Living people
1989 births
Kazakhstani male sport wrestlers
Wrestlers at the 2012 Summer Olympics
Olympic wrestlers of Kazakhstan
Wrestlers at the 2010 Asian Games
Wrestlers at the 2014 Asian Games
World Wrestling Championships medalists
Asian Games competitors for Kazakhstan
Asian Wrestling Championships medalists
Wrestlers at the 2020 Summer Olympics
People from Kyzylorda Region